Mendip is a local government district in the English county of Somerset. The Mendip district covers a largely rural area of  ranging from the Mendip Hills through on to the Somerset Levels. It had a population of approximately 110,000 in 2014. The administrative centre of the district is Shepton Mallet.

In the United Kingdom, the term listed building refers to a building or other structure officially designated as being of special architectural, historical or cultural significance; Grade II* structures are those considered to be "particularly significant buildings of more than local interest". Listing was begun by a provision in the Town and Country Planning Act 1947. Once listed, severe restrictions are imposed on the modifications allowed to a building's structure or its fittings. In England, the authority for listing under the Planning (Listed Buildings and Conservation Areas) Act 1990 rests with Historic England, a non-departmental public body sponsored by the Department for Digital, Culture, Media and Sport; local authorities have a responsibility to regulate and enforce the planning regulations.

There are 210 Grade II* listed buildings in Mendip. The list includes a large number of churches, some of which are Norman. Several buildings are associated with the church, particularly the Anglican Glastonbury Abbey and Wells Cathedral along with the Benedictine Downside Abbey. Many of the rest of the buildings are urban or rural houses ranging in date from the 12th to 19th centuries. Trade in the area is represented by market crosses and the Anglo-Bavarian Brewery. Shepton Mallet Prison and a village lock-up are also included in the list. The oldest is  the Church of St Mary, Laverton, while the most recent is Mells War Memorial by Sir Edwin Lutyens.

Buildings 

|}

See also 
 Grade II* listed buildings in Somerset
 Grade I listed buildings in Mendip

Notes

References

External links 

Grade II* listed buildings in Mendip District
Lists of Grade II* listed buildings in Somerset